Zearalanone (ZAN) is a semi-synthetic mycoestrogen that is a derivative of zearalenone (ZEN). Zearalanone is extracted from medical herbs and  edible herbs alone with other substance called aflatoxins in the same time by a specific immunoaffinity column. Zearalanone has six analog. They are ZEN, zearalanone, α-zeralanol, β-zeralanol, α-zearalenol, and β-zearalenol.

See also
 α-Zearalenol
 β-Zearalenol
 Taleranol
 Zeranol

References

Estrogens
Lactones
Resorcinols